Patrick Powers may refer to:

 Patrick T. Powers (1860–1925), American baseball executive and manager
 Patrick Powers (volleyball) (born 1958), American former volleyball player
 Pat Powers (businessman) (1870–1948), Irish-American businessman and movie producer

See also
 Patrick Power (disambiguation)